Life-Line was a Baptist missionary boat used to conduct ministry work in the Coos Bay region of southwestern Oregon, United States, from 1914 to 1923.

Construction 
Life-Line was designed by George H. Hitchings and built at Coos Bay for Reverend G. L. Hall of the American Baptist Publication Society.

Operations 
Once complete, "this little ship, under zealot Captain Lund, ran up and down the coast for the Baptist Missionary Society, saving the souls of erring seamen and longshoremen alike."

Sinking 
On May 26, 1923, Life-Line was being taken north from Coos Bay to Kelso, Washington, under command of Captain Lund who was operating the vessel with a deckhand.  Life-Line foundered off the coast, just south of Neahkahnie, and Captain Lund and the deckhand swam to shore.  The vessel washed ashore and was later covered by the sand, where it was forgotten until 1949, when a bulldozer uncovered the wreck.

See also 

 Lifeline (disambiguation)

Notes 

Ships built in Oregon
Shipwrecks of the Oregon coast
Buildings and structures in Coos County, Oregon
Christian missions
1914 ships
Baptist Christianity in Oregon
American Baptist Churches USA